Zacchia is an Italian surname. Notable people with the surname include:

Laudivio Zacchia (1565–1637), Italian cardinal
Paolo Zacchia the Elder (1490–1561), Italian Renaissance painter
Steve Zacchia (born 1982), Swiss racing driver

Italian-language surnames